The 1956 New York Giants season was the franchise's 74th season. The team finished in sixth place in the National League with a 67–87 record, 26 games behind the Brooklyn Dodgers.

Offseason 
 December 3, 1956: Roger McCardell was drafted by the Giants from the Milwaukee Braves in the 1956 minor league draft.
 Prior to 1956 season: Ernie Broglio was purchased by the Giants from the Vancouver Mounties.

Regular season

Season standings

Record vs. opponents

Opening Day lineup

Notable transactions 
 June 14, 1956: Alvin Dark, Don Liddle, Whitey Lockman and Ray Katt were traded by the Giants to the St. Louis Cardinals for Dick Littlefield, Jackie Brandt, Red Schoendienst, Bill Sarni and a player to be named later. The Cardinals completed the deal by sending Gordon Jones to the Giants on October 1.

Roster

Player stats

Batting

Starters by position 
Note: Pos = Position; G = Games played; AB = At bats; H = Hits; Avg. = Batting average; HR = Home runs; RBI = Runs batted in

Other batters 
Note: G = Games played; AB = At bats; H = Hits; Avg. = Batting average; HR = Home runs; RBI = Runs batted in

Pitching

Starting pitchers 
Note: G = Games pitched; IP = Innings pitched; W = Wins; L = Losses; ERA = Earned run average; SO = Strikeouts

Other pitchers 
Note: G = Games pitched; IP = Innings pitched; W = Wins; L = Losses; ERA = Earned run average; SO = Strikeouts

Relief pitchers 
Note: G = Games pitched; W = Wins; L = Losses; SV = Saves; ERA = Earned run average; SO = Strikeouts

Farm system 

LEAGUE CHAMPIONS: Cocoa

Notes

References 
 1956 New York Giants at Baseball Reference
 1956 New York Giants at Baseball Almanac

New York Giants (NL)
San Francisco Giants seasons
New York Giants season
1956 in sports in New York City
1950s in Manhattan
Washington Heights, Manhattan